Vitalie is a Romanian-language given name that may refer to:

Vitalie Bordian
Vitalie Bulat
Vitalie Călugăreanu
Vitalie Cercheș
Vitalie Ciobanu
Vitalie Grușac
Vitalie Manaliu
Vitalie Marinuța
Vitalie Nagacevschi
Vitalie Pîrlog
Vitalie Plămădeală
Vitalie Railean
Vitalie Zlatan
Vitalie Zubac

Romanian masculine given names